Werfel is a German and Jewish surname, mentioned in Denmark, Poland, Czech Republic.

Notable people with this name include:

 Alma Werfel (1879–1964, Alma Maria Mahler Gropius Werfel, née Schindler), wife of Gustav Mahler, Walter Gropius, Franz Werfel
 Daniel Werfel, American administrator
 Franz Werfel (1890–1945), Jewish Bohemian-Austrian novelist, playwright, and poet
 Hanna Werfel (1896–1964), sister of Franz Werfel, wife of Herbert Fuchs-Robettin, mistress of Alban Berg
  (1764–1831), Danish writer, translator and magazine publisher
 Louis Werfel (1916–1943), American Orthodox rabbi, military rabbi, The Flying Rabbi
 Roman Werfel (1906–2003), Polish communist apparatchik
 Rudolf Werfel, father of Franz Werfel

Other
 12244 Werfel (1988 RY2), a main-belt asteroid discovered on 1990

See also 

Danish-language surnames
German-language surnames
Jewish surnames